This is a list of Baywatch Nights episodes.

Series overview

Episodes

Season 1 (1995–96)

Season 2 (1996–97)

External links
 
 

Baywatch Nights